Joan Lingard MBE (8 April 1932 – 12 July 2022) was a Scottish writer. Lingard was born in Edinburgh, Scotland, but spent many years living in Belfast, Northern Ireland.

Career 
Lingard wrote novels for both adults and children. She is known for the young adults aimed Kevin and Sadie series, which have sold over one million copies and had been translated into several languages as of 2010.

Her first novel Liam's Daughter was an adult-orientated novel published in 1963. Her first children's novel was The Twelfth Day of July (the first of the five Kevin and Sadie books) in 1970.

Lingard received the Buxtehuder Bulle award in 1986 for Across the Barricades. Tug of War has also received great success: shortlisted for the Carnegie Medal 1989, The Federation of Children's Book Group Award 1989, runner-up in the Lancashire Children's Book Club of the year 1990 and shortlisted for the Sheffield Book Award. In 1998, her book Tom and the Tree House won the Scottish Arts Council Children's Book Award. Her last novel, Trouble on Cable Street was published.

Lingard's writing has been called "alive" and "intelligent, warm", "Solid and interesting."

Personal life and honours 
Lingard was born to Elizabeth (nee Beattie) and Henry Lingard in a taxi in Edinburgh's Royal Mile, but grew up in Holland Gardens, Belfast, where she lived until she was 18. She attended Strandtown Primary School and was then awarded a scholarship into Bloomfield Collegiate School. She was awarded an MBE in 1998 for services to children's literature.

Lingard had three daughters from a short-lived first marriage and five grandchildren. Until her death, she lived in Edinburgh with architect Martin Birkhans (married 1972), her Latvian-Canadian husband. Lingard died on 12 July 2022 at the age of 90.

Works

Adult novels 
 Liam's Daughter (1963)
 The Prevailing Wind (1960)
 The Tide Comes In (1966)
 The Headmaster (1967)
 A Sort of Freedom (1968)
 The Lord On Our Side (1970)
 The Second Flowering of Emily Mountjoy (1979)
 Greenyards (1981)
 Sisters by Rite (1984)
 Reasonable Doubts (1986)
 The Women's House (1989)
 After Colette (1993)
 Dreams of Love and Modest Glory  (1995)
 The Kiss (2002)
 Encarnita's Journey (2005)
 After You've Gone (2007)

Children's novels
 The Twelfth Day of July (1970)
 Frying as Usual (1971)
 Across the Barricades (1972)
 The Clearance (1973) source material for the BBC TV series, Maggie
 Into Exile (1973)
 A Proper Place (1974)
 The Resettling (1975) source material for the BBC TV series, Maggie 
 The Pilgrimage (1976) source material for the BBC TV series, Maggie
 Hostages to Fortune (1976)
 The Reunion (1977) source material for the BBC TV series, Maggie
 Snake Among the Sunflowers (1977)
 The Gooseberry (1978) aka Odd Girl Out (2000)
 The File on Fraulein Berg (1980)
 Strangers in the House (1981)
 The Winter Visitor (1983)
 The Freedom Machine (1986)
 The Guilty Party (1987)
 Rags and Riches (1988)
 Tug of War (1989)
 Glad Rags (1990)
 Can You Find Sammy the Hamster? (1990)
 Between Two Worlds (1991)
 Morag and the Lamb (1991)
 Secrets and Surprises (1991)
 Hands Off Our School (1992)
 Night Fires (1993)
 Clever Clive and Loopy Lucy (1993)
 Slow Flo and Boomerang Bill (1994)
 Sulky Suzy and Jittery Jack (1995)
 Lizzie's Leaving (1995)
 Dark Shadows (1998)
 Tom and the Tree House (1998)
 A Secret Place (1998)
 The Egg Thieves (1999)
 Natasha's Will (2000)
 River Eyes (2000)
 Me and My Shadow (2001)
 Tortoise Trouble (2002)
 Tell the Moon to Come Out (2003)
 The Sign of the Black Dagger (2005)
 The Eleventh Orphan (2006)
 What to Do About Holly (2009)
 What Holly Did (2012)
 Trouble on Cable Street (2014)

References

External links

Joan Lingard Official website
 

1932 births
2022 deaths
Members of the Order of the British Empire
People educated at Bloomfield Collegiate School
Writers from Edinburgh
Scottish women novelists
British writers of young adult literature
Women writers of young adult literature
20th-century Scottish novelists
20th-century Scottish women writers
21st-century Scottish novelists
21st-century Scottish women writers